Ahaus (Westphalian: Ausen) is a town in the district of Borken in the state of North Rhine-Westphalia, Germany. It is located near the border with the Netherlands, lying some 20 km south-east of Enschede and 15 km south from Gronau. Ahaus is the location of one of Germany's interim storage facilities for radioactive spent fuel.

Twin towns – sister cities

Ahaus is twinned with:
 Argentré-du-Plessis, France
 Haaksbergen, Netherlands

Notable people
 Friedrich Koechling (1893–1970), officer, general of infantry
 Michael Denhoff (born 1955), composer and cellist
 Jens Spahn (born 1980), politician (CDU), Member of Bundestag
 Heike Wermer (born 1988), CDU politician
 Urszula Radwańska (born 1990), Polish tennis player
 Stefan Thesker (born 1991), footballer

See also
 Gesellschaft für Nuklear-Service
 Eintracht Ahaus

References

Towns in North Rhine-Westphalia
Borken (district)